The River Street Historic District encompasses a historic industrial area in the Fair Haven section of New Haven, Connecticut.  Located south of Church Street between James Street and Blatchley Avenue, the industrial buildings here date to New Haven's growth as a major industrial center between the American Civil War and World War I, with significant emphasis on metalworking businesses.  The district was listed on the National Register of Historic Places in 1989.

Description and history
It includes three large industrial complexes dating from the 1870s to the 1910s, with most buildings constructed out of load-bearing brick or masonry. It is significant in New Haven's industrial history as the site of several metals-related manufacturing enterprises. It includes the Dutee Wilcox Flint auto plant, a nail manufacturing plant, the complex of the National Pipe Bending Company, and others.

The area developed as a major industrial area after the Civil War due to New Haven's status as a major railroad junction, with ready access to nearby railroads and a supply of both skilled and unskilled labor from immigration and the city's earlier industries.  In 1869, Hobart Bigelow expanded his boiler manufacturing operation to a new location in Fair Haven, and in 1883 he established National Pipe Bending, which manufactured parts for use in his boilers.  The area reached its largest extent due to war-related manufacturing in World War I, and declined thereafter.  The layout of the buildings was made to maximize access to railroad access spurs that ran along what are now some of the area's roads.

See also
National Register of Historic Places listings in New Haven, Connecticut

References

Gallery

National Register of Historic Places in New Haven, Connecticut
Fair Haven (New Haven)
Historic districts in New Haven, Connecticut
Historic districts on the National Register of Historic Places in Connecticut